Time and the Conways  is a 1984 drama film directed by Vladimir Basov and based on the eponymous 1937 play by English playwright J. B. Priestley, filmed in 1984.

Plot 
Action takes place in Britain during the 20 years between the two wars. The film explores the relationship in a once wealthy family, whose members, in their own way, are experiencing the collapse of their plans and hopes.

Cast 
 Rufina Nifontova as Mrs. Conway
 Vladimir Basov, Jr. as Ernest Beevers in youth
 Vladimir Basov as Ernest Beevers at maturity
 Margarita Volodina as Kay
 Yevgeny Leonov as Alan Conway
 Alyona Bondarchuk as Magee in his youth
 Irina Skobtseva as Magee twenty years later
  Marianna Strizhenova as  Joan Halford
 Oleg Tabakov as Robin Conway
 Igor Yankovsky as Gerald Thornton in his youth
 Rostislav Yankovsky as Gerald Thornton twenty years later

Almost all the characters in their youth were played by the children of those actors who played these same characters in their old age.

See also
 Time and the Conways

References

External links

1984 films
Films directed by Vladimir Basov
Soviet drama films
Mosfilm films
1980s Russian-language films
Films based on works by J. B. Priestley
1984 drama films